Pinglu County is a county in southern Shanxi province of China. It is under the administration of the prefecture-level city of Yuncheng and has a population of approximately 200,000. Pinglu is historically an agricultural county, producing apples, peaches, apricots, dates, and tomatoes. Local industry is largely concentrated in mining for coal, aluminum, iron, sulphur, and gypsum. Pinglu has a history that dates back to the Xia dynasty (c. 2070 – c. 1600 BC). Facing Henan's Sanmenxia to the south across the Yellow River, Pinglu is on the route of the G5512 Jincheng–Xinxiang Expressway and China National Highway 209.

Pinglu was home to the Ling political family: Ling Jihua, Ling Zhengce, and Ling Wancheng.

Climate

References
www.xzqh.org 

County-level divisions of Shanxi